Vote pairing, in the UK and Australia, or pairing, is the mechanism by which two members of parliament of opposing parties agree, with the consent of their party whips, to abstain from voting if the other one is unable to vote. Thus they maintain the balance of votes if one or the other is unable to attend. A three-line whip would usually be excepted from this agreement. For MPs who are not paired a bisque, a rota system allowing absence is used. This article is not about this process, but about peer to peer voting in elections among constituents.

In the US, pairing occurs when two legislators in the same chamber agree to allow their votes to cancel each other out. Such pairing can occur between members of the same party. For example, in 2018, Senators Murkowski and Daines (both Republican) paired their votes on the Kavanaugh nomination, so that the former voted "present", while the latter attended his daughter's wedding.

Prior to the 2000 election, "vote pairing" also mean legislators in opposing parties agreeing. However, in that election, that term was overloaded to mean voting a third-party candidate instead of for their own candidates. For example, a disaffected Democrat and a disaffected Republican both agreeing to vote for a third-party candidate instead of for the candidates of their own parties. However, by the 2004 presidential election this "vote swapping" was also being called "vote pairing", and the various people who had created vote swapping sites for the 2000 election had banded together as the now-defunct website, VotePair.org. This has however since been overcome by the "swap" terminology used in Canada and the UK. Today, 'swap' is almost universally used to mean constituents, whereas 'pairing' continues to mean legislators agreeing to pair up.

Vote swapping or co-voting occurs when two people promise to voting in a mutually agreed upon manner. Vote pairing (like legislators, one on one) is the most common example of vote pairing, where a voter in one district agrees to vote tactically for a less-preferred candidate or party who has a greater chance of winning in their district, in exchange for a voter from another district voting tactically for the candidate the first voter prefers, because that candidate has a greater possibility of winning in that district.

Vote pairing occurs informally (i.e., without binding contracts) but sometimes with great sophistication in the United States, United Kingdom, and Canada. Organized online venues in all three countries have enabled persons who want to pair up to co-vote/swap. In all three countries, the process has been subjected to legal challenge and been deemed legal. see below.

Using UK elections as an example, tactical voting is often between the Labour Party and the Liberal Democrats. There may be one constituency in which the Labour Party and the Conservative Party candidates are running in a tight race, with the Liberal Democrat far behind. In another constituency, the Liberal Democrat and Conservative candidates may be in a tight race, with the Labour candidate far behind. A Liberal Democrat voter in the first constituency would agree to vote for the Labour candidate in exchange for a Labour voter from the second constituency voting for the Liberal Democrat candidate.

Tactical voting has been used since 2000 as a strategy for the U.S. presidential election, with voters from "safe" states, or nonswing states, voting for third-party candidates, and voters from states with contested races, or swing state, voting for the second-preference candidate of the voters from the third party. By the United States Electoral College for presidential elections, all of a state's votes go to the winning candidate for that state, no matter how close the margin was (Maine and Nebraska excepted). Often third-party candidates for president are unable to garner any Electoral College votes, but they can call attention to their causes by the total popular vote that they garner. In vote-pairing agreements, third-party supporters in swing states vote strategically with major-party supporters in nonswing states, in the hope that the third-party candidate will get more of the popular vote, while the major-party candidate gets more of the Electoral College vote.

 Mechanics 

The concern often gets raised on whether vote pairing can be used by opposing parties to manipulate an election or sabotage a candidate. However, in practice, such ideas of manipulation turn out to be impractical and self-defeating.

For an example, suppose that in the 2004 election the former Republican Pat Buchanan had again run for president under the Reform Party (as he did in the 2000 election). Suppose that supporters of the 2004 Republican candidate, George W. Bush, had set up vote pairing web sites so that Buchanan supporters from swing states in the United States (such as Ohio, where the Democrats and Republicans were in a close race) would get matched with Bush supporters in solidly Democrat states (such as Massachusetts). This was not actually done of course (since Buchanan did not run in 2004), but suppose that Republican supporters of George W. Bush had gotten concerned that Democratic supporters of John Kerry would try to sabotage these web sites or manipulate the election by posing as either Bush or Buchanan supporters. However, if such Democrats had done so, all they could do is pose as George W. Bush supporters in solidly Democratic states or as Buchanan supporters in swing states. In the former situation (Democrats posing as Bush supporters in solidly Democratic states such as Massachusetts), all they could do is trick Buchanan supporters in swing states to cast their vote for Bush—which would only hurt the Democratic candidate, John Kerry. Similarly, in the latter situation (Democrats posing as |Buchanan supporters in swing states), all they could do is trick Bush supporters in solidly Democrat states to vote for Buchanan—which wouldn't change the election since the Democrat candidate, John Kerry, would very likely carry those states anyway.

One can work through this same issue in the opposite political direction—where it actually was a concern of Democrats in the 2004 election. In the 2004 presidential election, votepair.org matched Democratic Party supporters of John Kerry in staunchly Republican states with third-party supporters in swing states (including Ralph Nader supporters, Libertarian Party supporters of Michael Badnarik, or Green Party supporters of David Cobb). A common question was whether Republican supporters of George W. Bush could manipulate the election by posing as John Kerry supporters or as third-party supporters. However, if such people had posed as third-party supporters in swing states, all they could do is trick John Kerry supporters in staunchly Republican states to vote for a third-party candidate—which wouldn't change the outcome of the election (since George W. Bush would win those states anyway). Similarly if such people had posed as John Kerry supporters in staunchly Republican states, all they could do is trick third-party supporters in swing states to vote for John Kerry—which would have politically hurt George W. Bush, not helped him.

One can similarly think through the possibilities of say a left third-party supporter in a swing state trying to trick Democrats in red states into voting for third parties. In an extreme case, say a Ralph Nader supporter in Florida in 2004 had used different email addresses and names to register ten different times with votepair.org and then tried to manipulate ten different Texas Democrats to vote for Nader, while casting his own ballot in Florida not for John Kerry but for Nader as well. This is perhaps the point where the process is the most vulnerable to mistrust. However, the outcome in Texas would still have gone unchanged—all of the Texas electoral votes would have still gone to Bush. The outcome in Florida would have been more vulnerable. Arguably though, the Nader "supporter" in Florida would have done more to hurt third parties than help them. If he told anyone he had done this, he might have started a rumor that third-party supporters can't be trusted, driving Democrats in red states away from votepair.org and lowering the total votes third parties might get. Consequently, the best strategy for a third-party supporter to do in a swing state is to just enter into a vote pair honestly. They can then tell others about how they had done so in order to spread understanding of vote pairing. A similar reasoning would apply to Democrats in non-swing states not following through on a vote pair agreement, or to Republicans and supporters of politically right third parties not following through on vote pairs. However, dishonest dealings actually tend to correct themselves since at least one voter casts a vote the imposter would not want cast. Vote swap' is thus remarkably immune to most manipulations and deceptions.

Ultimately the only real way to manipulate vote pairing, and its effect on an election outcome, is to prevent people from learning about it, not to pose as a different kind of voter. Arguably, this kind of manipulation—preventing people from learning about vote pairing—is what happened in the 2000 presidential election, as discussed below.

Not "strategic voting" 

While it is sometimes portrayed as a strategic voting method, vote swaps are not at all similar in mechanism or outcomes:
no central authority tells anyone how to vote - individual voters are agreeing with only one other person they choose to trust, not with any particular advisor. Each voter could be relying on radically varying expectations about the vote.
small parties receive the same vote totals as they would otherwise, whereas in "strategic" voting, large parties that "can win" gain votes and small parties lose almost all support
individuals exercise some control across the country or region on who is elected elsewhere, by choosing their swap partner
party leaders - who are prominent advocates in 'strategic' publicity - are shut out entirely, as they are inhibited in supporting swaps that elect one candidate in their party as others are not supported

Legality 
In the United States, the legality of vote pairing in public elections has been questioned. Opponents claim that it is illegal to give or accept anything that has pecuniary value in exchange for a vote. (Indeed, efforts to buy or sell votes are illegal, and in the 2000 presidential election, there was even a satirical web site for buying and selling votes, vote-auction.com, which was shut down by an Illinois judge.) Proponents for vote pairing respond that vote pairing does not involve any pecuniary or monetary exchange; rather, simply informal, nonbinding agreements between people to vote strategically. Also, vote pairing is a routine practice in legislative bodies, city councils, etc.

On October 30, 2000, eight days before the November 2000 United States presidential elections, California Secretary of State Bill Jones threatened to prosecute voteswap2000.com, a California-based vote pairing website. In response, voteswap2000.com and votexchange2000.com immediately shut their virtual doors. The site operators, Alan Porter (votexchange2000.com) and William Cody (voteswap2000.com), and two potential users of the sites, Patrick Kerr and Steven Lewis, took the state of California to court.

On August 6, 2007, the 9th U.S. Circuit Court of Appeals ruled that "the websites' vote-swapping mechanisms as well as the communication and vote swaps they enabled were constitutionally protected" and California's spurious threats violated the First Amendment. The 9th Circuit did not decide whether the threats violated the U.S. Constitution's Commerce Clause.

"Both the websites' vote-swapping mechanisms and the communication and vote swaps that they enabled were...constitutionally protected. At their core, they amounted to efforts by politically engaged people to support their preferred candidates and to avoid election results that they feared would contravene the preferences of a majority of voters in closely contested states. Whether or not one agrees with these voters' tactics, such efforts, when conducted honestly and without money changing hands, are at the heart of the liberty safeguarded by the First Amendment."

In Canada, vote swapping with other people in Canada is legal per the Elections Act, as long as there is no money or "material benefit" that passes hands in the vote swap agreement. It's also illegal to trick someone using a false identity to influence someone to vote in a different way.

United States presidential election, 2000 

The debate regarding the legality of vote pairing peaked during the 2000 presidential election, when there was a strong effort to shut down the U.S. vote-pairing websites. However, the federal Ninth Circuit Court of Appeals eventually ruled against this action, and by the 2004 presidential election there was no such effort to shut down vote pairing.

The debate intensified in the final days of the 2000 election when six Republican state secretaries of state, led by the California Secretary of State Bill Jones, charged that vote-pairing web sites were illegal and threatened criminal charges against their creators. Multiple web sites had sprung up that were matching supporters of the Democratic presidential candidate, Al Gore, in non-swing states, with supporters in swing states of the strongest third-party candidate, Ralph Nader. Some argued that Ralph Nader was drawing support from left leaning Democrats that would otherwise vote for Al Gore. This would have allowed Nader to get more of the popular vote, or at least his fair share of it, and at the same time allowed Gore to perhaps get more of the Electoral College vote.

There are multiple reasons it would be important for Ralph Nader to still get his share of the national popular vote. One is that if he got five percent or more, then he could get federally distributed public funding in the next election. Also, and perhaps more importantly, he could possibly get included in the presidential debates for the next election in 2004. Third parties have protested their exclusion from the presidential debates.

In 2000, many of the vote pairing web sites were hosted in California, and so when the California Secretary of State, Bill Jones, charged that the web sites were illegal and threatened their creators with criminal prosecution, some (but not all) of the sites reluctantly shut down. The American Civil Liberties Union (ACLU) got involved to protect the web sites, seeking a restraining order against Jones and then a permanent injunction against him, alleging that he had violated the constitutional rights of the web site creators. However, the issue would only be resolved after the 2000 election had already occurred. The media at the time gave little coverage to vote pairing, except for how it was being charged as illegal.

It is possible that Jones's threats of criminal charges against the creators of the vote-pair web sites changed the outcome of the 2000 presidential election. One of the web sites, votetrader.org, tallied the number of people who had registered to pair their votes on all the vote-pairing websites. They tallied that 1,412 Nader supporters in Florida had gotten matched with Gore supporters from Republican states (although more likely vote paired with relatives and friends in other states—instead of over the Internet). George W. Bush was certified as winning Florida by only 537 votes—by Florida's Secretary of State, Katherine Harris. The Florida Supreme Court then changed this margin to just 193 votes at most, in their ruling on December 8, 2004. Approximately 2,900,000 people voted for George W. Bush and Al Gore each in Florida, while the number who voted for Ralph Nader was certified at 97,421. If only another 0.2% of the voters for Ralph Nader in Florida had vote paired (about 200 divided by 97,421)—if about 1,600 Nader supporters had vote paired instead of 1,400—Al Gore would have carried the election.

There were numerous other controversies in Florida's vote count: from the Palm Beach County butterfly ballots; to the question of whether Bush would have still won the state in a full recount; to how Katherine Harris, a Republican, was the co-chair of the Bush campaign in Florida at the same time she was the Florida state secretary of state. Notably, the California state secretary of state, Bill Jones, who charged that the vote-pairing web sites were illegal, was also a Republican supporter of George W. Bush. The federal Ninth Circuit Court of Appeals would eventually rule against him, but this decision did not come down until February 6, 2003, long after the 2000 election was already over. In the next presidential election, in 2004, the legality of the vote-pairing web sites went unquestioned. Indeed, the California state secretary of state for the 2004 election (a successor to Bill Jones) publicly announced, before that election, that vote pairing was legal.

United States presidential election, 2016 

In United States presidential elections, vote pairing usually comes in the form of voters from "safe" states, or non-swing states, voting for third-party candidates, and voters from swing states voting for their second-preference candidate. This form of vote pairing encourages third-party support while minimizing the risk that the more favored major-party candidate will lose electoral votes in the nationwide election (i.e., the "spoiler effect"). In the 2016 United States presidential election, this usually manifested in the form of supporters in swing states of Libertarian candidate Gary Johnson and Green Party candidate Jill Stein swapping votes with supporters in blue states of Democratic candidate Hillary Clinton.

Single-winner elections 
Vote pairing is a voter strategy for single-winner elections, but it is made moot by the election system of instant-runoff voting, or ranked voting. Vote pairing allows a person to electorally support a candidate who is unlikely to win an election, without inadvertently preventing the election of another candidate whom they would otherwise prefer. Instant-runoff voting addresses this same problem within an official voting system. In instant-runoff voting, voters rank their choices. The vote counting runs through everyone's first choices and then the candidate who comes in last gets taken out. The votes of everyone who voted for that candidate then get redistributed to their second-choice candidates and the counting runs through everyone's new top choices again. The process repeats until there's only one candidate left. Advocates of vote pairing tend to simultaneously advocate instant-runoff voting in election reform.

Another alternative is approval voting, which does not use a rank ballot. In approval voting, voters vote for as many candidates as they approve of. The total number of approval votes can greatly exceed the number of voters, but the candidate with the most approval votes wins.

See also 
 Condorcet method
 Instant-runoff voting
 National Popular Vote Interstate Compact
 Tactical voting
 Vote pairing in the United States presidential election, 2016

References 

Elections